The National Youth Advocacy Coalition, or NYAC, which ceased to operate on May 12, 2011, was an organization which sought to fight discrimination against and promote the leadership and wellness for lesbian, gay, bisexual, transgender, queer and questioning (LBGTQ) youth.

NYAC was founded in 1993 as the National Advocacy Coalition on Youth and Sexual Orientation, a project of the Hetrick-Martin Institute.  The purpose of the organization was to support LGBTQ young people and their allies in adding their voices to the growing LGBTQ rights movement.   The group expanded when it added the Bridges Project, the first national informational clearinghouse for LGBTQ youth and the organizations that serve them founded by the American Friends Service Committee.

A membership organization, NYAC attracted organizations from all over the country.  One the hallmarks of the organization were the national and regional summits.  The National Summit, usually held in Washington, DC attracted hundreds of youth advocates and allies each year, culminating in visits to Congress.

At its height NYAC had over ten staff and a $1M+ budget. Much of its work centered on both social justice advocacy work, LGBTQ youth organization capacity building, LGBTQ youth leadership development, and HIV/STI prevention and education work..

See also

LGBT rights in the United States
List of LGBT rights organizations
Rea Carey

References 

 Metro Weekly, NYAC's Last Days, May 5, 2011

LGBT youth organizations based in the United States
1993 establishments in the United States
Organizations disestablished in 2011
History of LGBT civil rights in the United States
LGBT political advocacy groups in the United States
Defunct LGBT organizations in the United States